The Aloha Tower is a retired lighthouse that is considered one of the landmarks of the state of Hawaii in the United States. Opened on September 11, 1926, at a then astronomical cost of $160,000, the Aloha Tower is located at Pier 9 of Honolulu Harbor. It has been, and continues to be, a guiding beacon welcoming vessels to the City and County of Honolulu. Just as the Statue of Liberty greeted hundreds of thousands of immigrants each year to New York City, the Aloha Tower greeted hundreds of thousands of immigrants to Honolulu. At 10 stories and 184 feet (56 m) of height topped with 40 feet (12 m) of flag mast, for four decades the Aloha Tower was the tallest structure in Hawaii. It was built in the Hawaiian Gothic architectural style.

History

Attack on Pearl Harbor

The Aloha Tower was painted in camouflage to disappear at night.

Redevelopment

In 1981, the Governor of Hawaii and the Hawaii State Department of Business, Economic Development and Tourism established the Aloha Tower Development Corporation. The public corporation was charged with developing the land around the Aloha Tower to benefit the state's commercial trade industry based at Honolulu Harbor while at the same time providing the residents of Hawaii with ample access to the downtown waterfront. The entire Aloha Tower Complex, as defined by the public corporation, was identified as Piers 5 and 6, Piers 8 through 23, and portions of Nimitz Highway and Iwilei.

Museum marketplace

In 1982, the Hawaii Maritime Center was opened near the Aloha Tower in an old royal pier to present the history of Honolulu Harbor and the relative industries it served. In 2002, the Hawaii Maritime Center became an incorporated institution of the Bishop Museum. The center was closed to the public on May 1, 2009.

Docked at the royal pier is the Falls of Clyde, a historic shipping vessel.

Recent developments

The Aloha Tower Development Corporation continues its work today with plans to modernize the facilities and infrastructure in and around the Aloha Tower Complex. Its most significant hurdle is to find a way of making travel through Nimitz Highway more efficient. In 2004, a controversial proposal was made to construct an underground highway tunnel beneath the complex. Other proposals include the establishment of streetcars, elimination of commercial high-rises in the area and increase of high-rise residential units instead. State officials want to close the parking lot fronting the Aloha Tower and destroy the adjacent Hawaiian Electric Company power plant, then fill the space with a park. In consideration of heightened security measures after 9/11, tourist access to the observation deck was restricted, but has since been reopened.

American hard rock band Skid Row performed in concert at Aloha Tower Stage on October 10, 1992.

Gallery

See also

List of lighthouses in Hawaii

References

External links

Aloha Tower Development Corporation
Aloha Tower Marketplace
Aloha Boat Days

Lighthouses completed in 1926
Lighthouses on the National Register of Historic Places in Hawaii
Towers in Hawaii
Observation towers on the National Register of Historic Places
Buildings and structures in Honolulu
Clock towers in Hawaii
1926 establishments in Hawaii
National Register of Historic Places in Honolulu
Skyscrapers in Honolulu
Skyscraper office buildings in Hawaii